The 2009 Kyalami Superbike World Championship round was the sixth round of the 2009 Superbike World Championship season. It took place on the weekend of May 15–17, 2009 at Kyalami, South Africa.

Results

Superbike race 1

Superbike race 2

Supersport race

References
 Superbike Race 1
 Superbike Race 2
 Supersport Race

External links
 The official website of the Superbike World Championship

Kyalami Round
Kyalami Superbike